Saint-Inglevert is a commune in the Pas-de-Calais department in the Hauts-de-France region of France.

Topnymy
The etymology of Saint-Inglevert, first attested as Sontingeveld in 1140, is now generally agreed to derive from a Common Germanic anthroponym *Sondo, followed by -ingen "people of" (see nearby e.g. Tardinghen) + -veld "field". The name was no longer understood sometime in the late Early Middle Ages, leading to a popular re-interpretation of the first syllable, "sant-ingheveld". This led to a folk etymology of prefixed saint (as is very common in toponymy across France), thus shaping Saint Inglevert. Thus the meaning is, "the field of the people of Sondo".

Despite old local veneration, if there ever truly was a  "Saint Inglevert" which perhaps influenced the name, the holy figure is unknown and lost to time.

Geography

Population

Places of interest
 The church of St. Barnabé dating from the sixteenth century.
 Traces of an old abbey-hospital.
 Saint-Inglevert Airfield

See also
Communes of the Pas-de-Calais department

References

External links

 Saint-Inglevert Airfield
St. Inglevert joust

Saintinglevert